The Serbian First League (Serbian: Prva liga Srbije) is the second-highest football league in Serbia. The league is operated by the Serbian FA. 16 teams compete in the league for the 2017–18 season. Two teams will be promoted to the Serbian SuperLiga. Four teams will be relegated to the Serbian League, the third-highest division overall in the Serbian football league system. Bratstvo Prigrevica, the winner of 2016–17 Serbian League Vojvodina decided to forfeit its promotion, as did the second-placed Omladinac Novi Banovci. As a consequence, third-placed TSC Bačka Topola took the vacant place. The season begun in August 2017 and will end in May 2018.

Team changes
The following teams have changed division since the 2016–17 season.

To First League
Promoted from Serbian League
 Teleoptik
 Temnić 1924
 TSC
 Radnički 1923

Relegated from Serbian SuperLiga
 Metalac
 Novi Pazar

From First League
Relegated to Serbian League
 Kolubara
 BSK Borča
 OFK Odžaci
 OFK Beograd

Promoted to Serbian SuperLiga
 Mačva Šabac
 Zemun

2017–18 teams

League table

Results

Top goalscorers

Including matches played on 31 May 2018; Source: Prva liga official website

Hat-tricks

References

External links
 Official website

Serbian First League seasons
2017–18 in Serbian football leagues
Serbia